Oleh Vasylyovych Yermak (born 9 March 1986) is a Ukrainian amateur and former professional football defender who plays for Ukrainian club imeni V.Z. Tura.

External links
 
 
 Profile on Football Squads

1986 births
Living people
People from Okhtyrka
Ukrainian footballers
Association football defenders
FC Naftovyk-Ukrnafta Okhtyrka players
FC Shakhtar Donetsk players
FC Shakhtar-2 Donetsk players
FC Shakhtar-3 Donetsk players
FC Arsenal Kyiv players
FC Nosta Novotroitsk players
FC Zorya Luhansk players
FC Krymteplytsia Molodizhne players
FC Oleksandriya players
FC Tiraspol players
FC Kolos Kovalivka players
CSF Bălți players
Ukrainian Premier League players
Ukrainian First League players
Ukrainian Second League players
Moldovan Super Liga players
Russian First League players
Ukrainian expatriate footballers
Expatriate footballers in Moldova
Ukrainian expatriate sportspeople in Moldova
Expatriate footballers in Russia
Ukrainian expatriate sportspeople in Russia
Sportspeople from Sumy Oblast